Ashley Marie Hatch (born May 25, 1995) is an American soccer player who plays as a forward for Washington Spirit of the National Women's Soccer League (NWSL). She has also played for the United States women's national soccer team.

Hatch was selected by the Courage as the second overall pick in the 2017 NWSL College Draft. Following the 2017 season, she was named 2017 NWSL Rookie of the Year after recording seven goals (including three game-winning goals) and one assist, which helped the Courage win the 2017 NWSL Shield. She previously played collegiate soccer for the BYU Cougars.

College career

Brigham Young University
Hatch attended Brigham Young University (BYU) where she played for the BYU Cougars women's soccer team from 2013 to 2016 in the West Coast Conference (WCC). During her freshman season, she started in all 21 games, scored six goals and provided seven assists. She earned All-WCC Freshman Team honors and was named an All-West  Honorable Mention, CollegeSportsMadness.com's WCC Freshman of the Year, and was ranked 82nd in the Freshman Top 100 by Top Drawer Soccer. During her sophomore season in 2014, Hatch's 15 shots in one match set a new school record. Her 18 goals tied for fifth highest in the program's history. She scored multiple goals in five games which ranked second in the program's history and first since 1996.  Hatch ranked ninth for goals scored per game, points per game and total goals scored per game nationwide. She was named Player of the Week by ESPNW on October 15 and was named WCC Co-Player of the Year. Hatch earned All-WCC First Team and NSCAA All-West Region First Team honors.

As a junior in 2015, Hatch started in 10 of the 13 games she played. She suffered an injury that prevented her from playing for the majority of the season. She scored four goals—including three game-winning goals— and recorded two assists. Hatch was ranked best player in the West Coast Conference by Top Drawer Soccer in 2015 and 2016. During her senior season, Hatch scored a hat-trick against Penn State in August and was named Player of the Week by ESPNW for a second time. She was also named NCAA and WCC Player of the Week. Hatch started in all twenty matches, scored 19 goals and recorded six assists during the season. She was named a semifinalist for the Hermann Trophy and was ranked the seventh best player in the country by Top Drawer Soccer.

On July 2, 2018, Utah Valley University announced they had hired Hatch as a volunteer assistant coach for the 2018 season, Hatch's sister Brianna plays on the UVU soccer team.

Club career

North Carolina Courage, 2017
Hatch was selected by the North Carolina Courage as the second overall pick of the 2017 NWSL College Draft. She signed with the team on April 10, 2017. She made her debut for the club during its second match of the 2017 season: a 1–0 win over Portland Thorns FC on April 17. Hatch scored her first goal on June 3 during a 2–0 win against FC Kansas City. During a match against the Boston Breakers on June 24, she scored the game-winning goal in the Courage's 1–0 win. She scored the game-winning goals in matches against the Seattle Reign FC on July 8 and Washington Spirit on August 19.

The Courage finished the regular season in first place with a  record winning the NWSL Shield and was the first team to secure a spot in the NWSL Playoffs after a 4–0 win over the Houston Dash where Hatch scored the fourth goal. Hatch scored seven goals in her 24 appearances for the Courage. After defeating the Chicago Red Stars 1–0 in the semi-finals and advancing to the NWSL Championship Final, the Courage lost 1–0 to the Portland Thorns.

Hatch was named 2017 NWSL Rookie of the Year after recording seven goals (including three game-winning goals) and one assist in her first professional season, which helped the Courage win the 2017 NWSL Shield.

Melbourne City, 2017–2018 (loan)
In October 2017, Hatch joined defending W-League champions Melbourne City for the 2017–18 W-League season. She was a regular contributor to the W-League champions earning 14 appearances and scoring twice. City's success brought them to the Grand Final against Sydney FC where Hatch helped City to a third-consecutive title.

Washington Spirit, 2018–present
In January 2018, Hatch was traded to the Washington Spirit along with teammate Taylor Smith in exchange for Crystal Dunn's rights. In 2021, Hatch helped the Spirit reach the NWSL championship, winning against the Chicago Red Stars, 2-1, in overtime.  On 31 October 2021 Hatch won the NWSL Golden Boot after finishing the regular season with 10 goals.

International career
Hatch made her senior national team debut for the United States on October 19, 2016, in a friendly match against Switzerland and her second appearance on April 5, 2018, against Mexico.

On August 23, 2018, Hatch was named to the United States U-23 team for the 2018 Nordic tournament.

On November 9, 2021, Hatch was named to the USWNT for 2 friendlies in Australia. In the first of the two against Australia, Hatch scored 24 seconds into the game to record her first International goal.

Personal life
Hatch is a member of the Church of Jesus Christ of Latter-day Saints. She married Jeff Van Buren in 2019.

Career statistics

International

International goals

Honors
North Carolina Courage
 NWSL Shield: 2017

Melbourne City
 W-League: 2017–18

Washington Spirit
 NWSL Championship: 2021
United States

 CONCACAF Women's Championship: 2022

 SheBelieves Cup: 2022, 2023

Individual
 NWSL Team of the Month: June 2017
 NWSL Rookie of the Year: 2017
 NWSL Golden Boot: 2021

References

Match reports

External links

 
 North Carolina Courage player profile
 National Women's Soccer League player profile
 U.S. Soccer player profile
 BYU player profile

1995 births
Living people
American Latter Day Saints
Women's association football forwards
American women's soccer players
BYU Cougars women's soccer players
North Carolina Courage draft picks
North Carolina Courage players
Melbourne City FC (A-League Women) players
Washington Spirit players
National Women's Soccer League players
United States women's international soccer players
Utah Valley Wolverines
College women's soccer coaches in the United States